De la Roca is a surname. Notable people with the surname include:

 Antonio de la Roca, an Anglo-French Antarctic explorer
 Joaquín Martínez de la Roca, a Spanish composer
 Zack de la Rocha, an American rapper and singer

See also
 Castellfollit de la Roca, a region of Spain
 La Roca de la Sierra, a region of Spain
 Castillo de San Pedro de la Roca, a Cuban fortress
 Della Rocca (disambiguation)
 Roca (disambiguation)